Germany is scheduled to compete at the 2017 World Aquatics Championships in Budapest, Hungary from 14 July to 30 July.

Medalists

Diving

Germany has entered 12 divers (six male and six female).

Men

Women

Mixed

High diving

Germany qualified two female high divers.

Open water swimming

Germany has entered ten open water swimmers

Swimming

German swimmers have achieved qualifying standards in the following events (up to a maximum of 2 swimmers in each event at the A-standard entry time, and 1 at the B-standard):

Men

Women

Mixed

Synchronized swimming

Germany's synchronized swimming team consisted of 13 athletes (1 male and 12 female).

Women

Mixed

 Legend: (R) = Reserve Athlete

References

Nations at the 2017 World Aquatics Championships
Germany at the World Aquatics Championships
2017 in German sport